Viktoria Valentinovna Postnikova (Russian: Виктория Валентиновна Постникова; born 12 January 1944) is a Russian pianist.

Biography
Postnikova was born in Moscow into a family of musicians. She entered the Central Music School of the Moscow Conservatory at age six, studying with E.B. Musaelian. She graduated in 1967, having studied there and in postgraduate courses with Professor Yakov Flier. In 1965, she received an honorable mention at the VII International Chopin Piano Competition. She subsequently also won prizes at the Leeds International Piano Competition in England, the Vianna da Motta International Music Competition in Lisbon, and the Fourth International Tchaikovsky Competition in Moscow.

Her repertoire is extremely broad.  She took part in concerts, recordings and recitals at home and abroad with her conductor husband Gennady Rozhdestvensky, whom she married in 1969. He died in June 2018. Their son, Sasha Rozhdestvensky, is a violinist.

Recordings
Postnikova has recorded all three Tchaikovsky concertos for Decca; the Busoni Piano Concerto along with the complete piano music of Tchaikovsky, Janáček, and Glinka for Erato; violin sonatas by Richard Strauss and Busoni for Chandos; and the complete piano concertos of Brahms, Chopin, and Prokofiev among many other recordings for Melodiya.

Notes

Further reading 
Loppert, Max, ed. Stanley Sadie, "Postnikova, Victoria [Viktoria] (Valentinova)", The New Grove Dictionary of Music and Musicians, First edition (London: Macmillan, 1980). .
Liner note with Viktoria Postnikova: M Mussorgsky, Pictures at an Exhibition, Pieces for Piano, Melodiya MA00009

External links
 Rayfield Allied profile

Russian classical pianists
Russian women pianists
Soviet classical pianists
20th-century classical pianists
1944 births
Living people
Prize-winners of the Leeds International Pianoforte Competition
Prize-winners of the International Chopin Piano Competition
Prize-winners of the International Tchaikovsky Competition
21st-century classical pianists
20th-century Russian musicians
20th-century Russian women musicians
21st-century Russian musicians
Women classical pianists
20th-century women pianists
21st-century women pianists